The Aleksander Fredro Monument in Wrocław (Polish: Pomnik Aleksandra Fredry we Wrocławiu) is a bronze statue dedicated to Polish Romantic-era poet, playwright and author Aleksander Fredro (1793–1876). Originally built in Lviv in 1897 according to Leonard Marconi's design, the monument was transferred to Wrocław in 1956.

History
The monument was designed by sculptor Leonard Marconi in 1897 in Lviv, Kingdom of Galicia and Lodomeria (part of the Austro-Hungarian Empire) and cast in bronze. The Neo-classical sculpture features playwright Aleksander Fredro on a sandstone pedestal with inscriptions on three sides wearing a chamarre and holding a roll of paper and a goose quill.

The monument was funded by the Lviv Artistic and Literary Society (Lwowskie Koło Literacko-Artystyczne) and ceremonially unveiled on October 24, 1897, at the Academic Square (currently Shevchenko Avenue) in Lviv in the presence of many prominent dignitaries including the Land Marshal of Galicia Stanisław Marcin Badeni, prince Eustachy Sanguszko, archbishop Izaak Mikołaj Isakowicz, and mayor of Lviv Godzimir Małachowski. The monument occupied that location until 1950. After the Second World War, Lviv was incorporated into the USSR and in 1945 in Kiev, the Polish delegation signed an additional protocol to the 1944 agreement between the Polish Committee of National Liberation and the Ukrainian SSR, which allowed to hand over to the Polish government the national monuments in Lviv connected to Polish culture and history with the exception of the Adam Mickiewicz Monument which "enjoys great popularity and is loved by the Ukrainian nation".

Transfer to Poland
The monument was transferred to Poland in March 1950. It was initially displayed in Wilanów where it remained until 1956. The city of Wrocław was chosen to host it considering the fact that after the war a great number of Poles from Lviv were repatriated there. Besides this, Aleksander Fredro visited Wrocław in the past as a young military officer fighting alongside Napoleon. It was unveiled on July 15, 1956, at the Wrocław Market Square in the place previously occupied by the Monument to Frederick William III of Prussia.

See also
John III Sobieski Monument in Gdańsk
Tadeusz Kościuszko Monument, Kraków
Monument to Prince Józef Poniatowski in Warsaw

References

1897 sculptures
Outdoor sculptures in Poland
Buildings and structures in Wrocław
Sculptures in Poland